Dolichoderus brevithorax is a species of ant in the genus Dolichoderus. Described by Menozzi in 1928, the species is only endemic to Indonesia.

References

Dolichoderus
Hymenoptera of Asia
Insects of Indonesia
Insects described in 1928